Matanović is a Serbo-Croatian surname. It may refer to:

Aleksandar Matanović, Serbian chess player 
Julijana Matanović, Croatian writer
Drago Matanović, Slovenian professor and author
Katarina Matanović-Kulenović, Croatian pilot
Milo Matanović, Prime Minister of the Kingdom of Montenegro from 1915 to 1916
Velibor Matanović, Montenegrin football manager
Matanović brotherhood in Vraka

Serbian surnames
Croatian surnames